WZKS (104.1 FM) is a radio station broadcasting in the Meridian, Mississippi, Arbitron market.

External links
Official website

ZKS
Urban adult contemporary radio stations in the United States